Thurgoland railway station was a small railway station built by the Sheffield, Ashton-Under-Lyne and Manchester Railway to serve the village of Thurgoland, South Yorkshire, England and opened on 5 December 1845. Due to cost-cutting measures involving staff and infrastructure the station was closed, along with Dukinfield Dog Lane, Hazelhead and Oxspring on 1 November 1847, making this one of the shortest-lived stations anywhere, with a life span of just one year and 11 months.

References 

 Dow, George. "Great Central Volume 1" (The Progenitors, 1813 - 1865), Locomotive Publishing Co., London, 1959.
 "A Railway Chronology of the Sheffield Area" Edited by Richard V. Proctor. Sheffield City Libraries, 1975.  

Disused railway stations in Barnsley
Woodhead Line
Railway stations in Great Britain opened in 1845
Railway stations in Great Britain closed in 1847
Thurgoland